Chen Li (born 13 March 1971) is a former professional tennis player from China.

Career
Chen, who comes from the city of Xiangtan in Hunan, played on the WTA Tour in the 1990s and won one title, the doubles at the 1994 China Open, with Li Fang as her partner. In 1996 she was runner-up in the singles at the Nokia Open in Beijing. En route to the final, which she lost to Wang Shi-ting, she accounted for three seeded players, Francesca Lubiani, Yayuk Basuki and Sandrine Testud. She competed as a wildcard at the 1997 Australian Open and was beaten in the first round by Natalia Medvedeva.

A two-time Olympian, Chen represented China at the 1992 Summer Olympics in Barcelona and 1996 Summer Olympics in Atlanta. At the Barcelona Olympics she lost in the first round to eventual bronze medalist Mary Joe Fernández. In Atlanta she competed in both the singles and doubles draws. She lost to top seed Monica Seles in the singles but her and Yi Jing-Qian made the second round of the doubles competition. They progressed in a walkover after fifth seeded Australian pairing had to withdraw when Rennae Stubbs was taken ill to hospital. In the second round the Chinese pair were beaten in three sets by the team from Thailand.

Chen won a total of seven medals for China at the Asian Games. This includes a gold medal in the women's doubles with Li Fang at the 1998 Asian Games in Bangkok.

In Fed Cup competition, Chen featured in 17 ties for a record 7–14 overall. One of these ties was against the United States in the second round of the World Group in the 1993 Federation Cup.

WTA Tour finals

Singles: 1 runner-up

Doubles: 1 title

ITF finals

Singles (6–7)

Doubles (7–2)

References

External links
 
 
 
 
 
 
 

1971 births
Living people
Chinese female tennis players
Olympic tennis players of China
Tennis players at the 1992 Summer Olympics
Tennis players at the 1996 Summer Olympics
Asian Games gold medalists for China
Asian Games silver medalists for China
Asian Games bronze medalists for China
Asian Games medalists in tennis
Tennis players at the 1990 Asian Games
Tennis players at the 1994 Asian Games
Tennis players at the 1998 Asian Games
Medalists at the 1990 Asian Games
Medalists at the 1994 Asian Games
Medalists at the 1998 Asian Games
Universiade medalists in tennis
Universiade gold medalists for China
People from Xiangtan
Tennis players from Hunan
Medalists at the 1993 Summer Universiade